The American Republic Insurance Company Headquarters Building is a historic building located in downtown Des Moines, Iowa, United States. It was completed in 1965 for the insurance company's headquarters and it continues to serve that purpose. It was listed on the National Register of Historic Places in 2015.

Architecture 
It was designed by the prominent Chicago architect Gordon Bunshaft of the architectural firm Skidmore, Owings & Merrill LLP. The Modernist building has no widows on its east and west elevations. The windows on the north and south elevations allow in daylight and keep out radiant heat.

References

External links

Office buildings completed in 1965
Office buildings in Des Moines, Iowa
National Register of Historic Places in Des Moines, Iowa
Office buildings on the National Register of Historic Places in Iowa
Modernist architecture in Iowa
Skidmore, Owings & Merrill buildings